Santah is an American indie rock band from Chicago, Illinois, United States.  The group formed in Urbana, Illinois while attending the University of Illinois at Urbana-Champaign. Their debut album, White Noise Bed, was released independently on May 6, 2010 and nationally, via No Sleep Records, on June 7, 2011. In interviews, Santah has described White Noise Bed as a break up record, 'trying to understand the separation between two people, the journey of two people from point A to... where ever it went.' Santah released You're Still A Lover on October 16 and on vinyl through Chicago based Saki Records in November. They spent October touring the US and Canada with Savor Adore and Royal Canoe in support of their EP release, including multiple shows at CMJ.

Discography

Studio albums
Chico (2015)
Awwh Man (May 2014)
You're Still A Lover (2012)
White Noise Bed (2010/2011)

Extended play
My Bones (2008)

References

External links 
 Official Website
 Official Myspace
 Official Facebook

Articles
Paste Magazine
Chicago Reader
Smile Politely
Radio Free Chicago

Indie rock musical groups from Illinois
No Sleep Records artists